Bassett Green is a suburb of Southampton, which has grown from the original small village of Basset. It remains part of the electoral ward of Bassett (q.v. for population). The area is mainly residential, with a mixture of Herbert Collins-designed houses and council built estates known as the Flowers Estate (or Flower Roads) and the Leaside Way Estate. Within Bassett Green are a community centre (on Honeysuckle Road), Bassett Green Primary School and Southampton Crematorium, as well as several of the University of Southampton's halls of residence.

Neighbouring areas are Bassett to the west, North Stoneham to the north, Swaythling to the east & southeast, and Highfield to the southwest.

Bassett Green is divided between two ecclesiastical parishes: North Stoneham & Bassett and Swaythling.

History

A family named 'Basset' is known to have lived in South Stoneham in the 15th century and the place name may be from their name. The area broadly occupied by Bassett today was known as Stoneham Common, shown on the 1791 map by Thomas Milne on which 'Bassets Lane' also appears (without any associated village). The village of Bassett appears on a 1810 map, located roughly where Bassett Green Village is today. In the late 18th century it grew as a retreat for rich people outside (and away from civic responsibilities in) the borough of Southampton. By the time of the Ordnance Survey of 1897, Basset had been renamed Bassett Green (with a double 't'), whilst a more westerly area (west of Bassett Wood) was identified as Bassett.

Part of the contract to build Southampton Civic Centre required the construction of social housing. The resulting housing estate was built between Swaythling and Bassett Green and is today known as the Flowers Estate or Flower Roads, as the street names on the estate carry a botanical theme.

Education
Bassett Green is served by Bassett Green Primary School on Honeysuckle Road and Cantell Secondary School on Violet Road. Cantell is a comprehensive secondary school with a specialism in Mathematics and Information and Communication Technology, and is thus officially titled Cantell Mathematics and Computing College. The school has also been largely rebuilt funded through the Private Finance Initiative.

References

Areas of Southampton